Féile an Phobail (The Community's Festival), also known as the West Belfast Festival is a community arts organisation known for its August Féile (Festival). The organisation is prominent for its promotion of Irish and international culture. The festival takes place on and around Falls Road in Belfast, Northern Ireland.

History

Foundations 
The festival was established in 1988 as a direct response to the Troubles, and specifically after the events of March 1988. The Special Air Service killed three Provisional Irish Republican Army members in Gibraltar. At one of the funerals of the three, an Ulster loyalist paramilitary attacked the funeral with grenades and pistols, killing three mourners (see Milltown Cemetery attack). At the funeral of one of the mourners, two plainclothes British servicemen were killed when they drove into a funeral procession (see Corporals killings). The community of west Belfast came under intense media scrutiny and was described by the British Broadcasting Corporation as a "terrorist community".

Seeing this portrayal of his community as negative, misleading and damaging, Gerry Adams gathered a small amount of friends and various local groups to organise a community festival. Its purpose was to celebrate the positive side of the community: its creativity, its energy, its passion for the arts and for sport. The Féile was, and is, aimed at providing events and entertainment at a price that the majority of the community could afford.

In August 1988 the first festival opened with a relatively humble parade of floats and bands and Gaelic Athletic Association clubs walking in their club regalia to an open-air party in Dunville Park. Street parties were organised throughout the west of the city. Door-to-door collections were made to fund day trips to the seaside for pensioners and outings for young people.

Present 
Féile an Phobail has garnered resounding praise and has grown to one of the largest community festivals in Europe. The carnival parade routinely brings together over 20,000 participants for a colourful, musical procession with specially-designed floats representing a chosen theme, dancers and children in costume and face-masks.

It has grown from a one-week festival to a year-round programme with many events. It established the first ever children's arts festival in Northern Ireland, the Draíocht Children's Arts Festival, with activities ranging from sports to multi-cultural and educational events through both Irish and English. In 2003, 6,000 children and young people participated in Draíocht events.

The festival also has its own radio station, Féile FM. The station initially broadcast across Belfast for two one-month periods in the spring and summer, during which young volunteers were professionally trained in media and management skills for free. In 2007, the radio was successful in securing a full-time licence, and now broadcasts seven days a week, throughout Belfast. Some trainees have gone on to find employment in the local media, including UTV, BBC Northern Ireland and Irish News Online in Belfast.

In May 2009, Féile an Phobail launched Belfast's first dedicated comedy festival, Laugh at the Bank.

During the August 15, 2021 event, DUP councilors called for public funding to be stopped due to pro-IRA chanting during The Wolfe Tones performance.

Festivals 
Féile an Phobail runs numerous festivals throughout the year. Among the festivals are:

 August Féile (Féile Lúnasa) – oldest project. Among Europe's largest community festivals, runs in August
 Féile an Earraigh – Springtime Irish traditional music festival
 Draíocht – annual children's festival beginning in mid-October
 Stand up in the West – monthly comedy night in Belfast's Western Bar, no longer running
 Laugh at the Bank – Belfast's first comedy festival. Launched May 2009

Performers 
Féile an Phobail has rostered national and international acts to perform with local musicians, catering for all tastes in dancing and music: from Irish traditional music to world music and pop. Notable acts include Altan, Brian Kennedy, Mary Black, the Afro-Cuban All Stars, the Harlem Gospel Choir, Westlife and Status Quo.

Local poets and writers have read their works on the same podium as renowned authors such as Patrick Mc Cabe, Roddy Doyle and Evelyn Conlon. The festival has hosted the works of Ireland's leading playwrights and theatre companies, and has been the launching pad for world premiers, such as Frank McGuinness's Someone Who'll Watch Over Me and Marie Jones' A Night in November by Dubbeljoint Productions.

The discussion and debates have included talks by world-class journalists and documentary makers including Robert Fisk (The Independent), Michael Moore (Oscar Winner) and have witnessed Gregory Campbell (Democratic Unionist Party) on the same panel as Alex Maskey (Sinn Féin) at the annual West Belfast Talks Back.

List of notable performers/speakers

Other 
Féile an Phobail has also been host to notable artists and painters from Ireland and abroad and hosts a festival-long exhibition in St. Mary's University College. Other community exhibitions take place around west Belfast, organised by community groups in association with the August Féile.

References

External links 
 
 20 Years On – BBC documentary about Féile an Phobail

Festivals in Belfast
Arts festivals in Northern Ireland
Music festivals in Northern Ireland
Tourist attractions in County Antrim
Comedy in Northern Ireland
Children's festivals in the United Kingdom
Tourism in County Antrim
1988 establishments in Northern Ireland